Bereza is a Ukrainian and Russian-language surname which literally means "birch tree". Notable people with this surname include:

 Boryslav Bereza (born 1974), Ukrainian politician
 Myron Bereza, Ukrainian-Canadian soccer player
 Yuriy Bereza (born 1970), Ukrainian politician

See also
Beryoza (disambiguation)
Byaroza, Belarusian-language version